Victoria Sambunaris (born 1964) is an American photographer. Sambunaris was born in Lancaster, Pennsylvania.

Education
Sambunaris earned her Bachelor of Arts from Mount Vernon College in 1986 and her Masters of Fine Arts from Yale University in 1999.

In 2010, she was awarded the Anonymous Was A Woman Award and was later hired by Yale University in 2012 as a lecturer in photography.

Collections
Her work is included in the collections of the Whitney Museum of American Art, the Museum of Modern Art, New York and the San Francisco Museum of Modern Art.

References

External links 
 Official web site

1964 births
Living people
People from Lancaster, Pennsylvania
Yale University alumni
Mount Vernon Seminary and College alumni
20th-century American photographers
21st-century American photographers
Yale University faculty
Photographers from Pennsylvania
20th-century American women photographers
21st-century American women photographers